Henry Davis (1886 Chicago, Illinois, U.S. – April 1, 1946 New York, New York, U.S.) was an American Broadway actor and singer.  He created the role of Robbins in Gershwin's opera Porgy and Bess and appeared on Broadway stages between 1900 and 1942.

External links

American male musical theatre actors
1886 births
1946 deaths
20th-century American singers
20th-century American male singers
Singers from Chicago
Male actors from Chicago